Mallik Island (variant: Mallikjuaq Island, meaning "big wave") is one of the uninhabited Canadian arctic islands of Qikiqtaaluk Region, Nunavut, Canada. It is located in Hudson Strait between Baffin Island's Foxe Peninsula and Dorset Island. Mallik Island and Dorset Island are joined by sand and boulders.

Geography
In addition to low mountains, there are waterfalls and crystalline lakes.

Fauna
Beluga whales, caribou, peregrine falcons, polar bears, seals, and snowy owls frequent this area.

Flora
Its habitat is characterized by rounded hills and low tundra valleys, and includes tundra wildflowers.

Territorial park
Mallikjuaq Territorial Park spans both Mallik Island and Dorset Island. It is notable for its Thule culture, Dorset culture, and Inuit archaeological sites dating back as far as 3,000 years. From Cape Dorset, at low tide, the hike to Mallikjuaq Park takes approximately 45 minutes. It is also reachable by boat.

References

Islands of Baffin Island
Islands of Hudson Strait
Uninhabited islands of Qikiqtaaluk Region
Territorial parks of Nunavut